Ambroise Michel (born 31 March 1982) is a French actor, director and writer.

Theater

Filmography

References

External links
 Ambroise Michel on Allociné
 

People from Meaux
20th-century French male actors
21st-century French male actors
French male television actors
French male film actors
French comedians
1982 births
Living people